Cephalonomia waterstoni, known generally as the parasitic grain wasp or rusty grain beetlewasp, is a species of cuckoo wasp in the family Bethylidae.

References

Parasitic wasps
Taxa named by Arthur Burton Gahan
Articles created by Qbugbot
Chrysidoidea